The auditor of public accounts of Kentucky is an elected constitutional officer in the executive branch of the U.S. state of Kentucky. Forty-seven individuals have occupied the auditor's office since statehood. The incumbent is Mike Harmon, a Republican.

Powers and duties
The auditor of public accounts "...ensures that public resources are protected, accurately valued, properly accounted for, and effectively employed to raise the quality of life of Kentuckians." More specifically, the auditor of public accounts conducts an array of external audits which examine financial condition, legal compliance, information technology systems, and program performance in governmental entities. The auditor's scope of authority extends to all state agencies, every public or private entity that receives state funds, all state-owned or operated enterprises such as prisons and public works, and every county, municipality, and school district in the commonwealth.

History
Initially, the auditor of public accounts served as a comptroller and tax collector for state government. The Reorganization Act of 1936 transferred those functions to other state agencies and established the auditor's office as "...an impartial agency entirely independent of state administration and charged with the responsibility of auditing the accounts and financial transactions of all Commonwealth spending agencies." Government auditing remains the primary function of the auditor's office to this day.

References

 
Kentucky